Phragmipedium longifolium is a species of orchid ranging from Costa Rica to Ecuador. Phragmipedium longifolium is a herb found natively in the coastal and Andean regions of Ecuador, among other surrounding countries.

References

External links 

longifolium
Orchids of Costa Rica
Orchids of Ecuador